The 2022 Kirklees Metropolitan Borough Council election took place on 5 May 2022. One third of councillors—23 out of 69—on Kirklees Metropolitan Borough Council were elected. The election took place alongside other local elections across the United Kingdom.

Following the previous council election in 2021, no party held a majority of seats. Labour held 33, and ran a minority administration. The Conservatives held 19, the Liberal Democrats held 9, the Greens held 3 and independent councillors and councillors for local parties held the remaining five.

Background 

The Local Government Act 1972 created a two-tier system of metropolitan counties and districts covering Greater Manchester, Merseyside, South Yorkshire, Tyne and Wear, the West Midlands, and West Yorkshire starting in 1974. Kirklees was a district of the West Yorkshire metropolitan county. The Local Government Act 1985 abolished the metropolitan counties, with metropolitan districts taking on most of their powers as metropolitan boroughs. The West Yorkshire Combined Authority was established in 2014 and began electing the mayor of West Yorkshire in 2021.

Kirklees Council has generally been under no overall control or Labour control since its creation, with the Conservatives controlling the council between 1976 and 1979. The council was under no overall control from 1999 until the 2018 election, when Labour gained two seats to achieve an overall majority on the council. Labour's majority narrowed, with the party holding 35 seats following the 2019 election. Three Labour councillors resigned from their party in November 2020, citing national issues and linked by media to the suspension of the former Labour leader Jeremy Corbyn. In the most recent council election in 2021, the council remained in no overall control with Labour winning 12 seats on 35.9% of the vote, the Conservatives winning 9 seats on 38.0% of the vote, the Liberal Democrats winning 2 seats on 10.2% of the vote, the Green Party winning one seat on 10.4% of the vote and the Heavy Woollen District Independents winning one seat with 0.4% of the vote.

Positions up for election in 2022 were last elected in 2018. In that election, 12 Labour councillors were elected, as were seven Conservatives, three Liberal Democrats, one Green and one independent.

Campaign 

The Local Democracy Reporting Service reported that Almondbury, Colne Valley, Dalton, Denby Dale, Dewsbury East, Golcar, Heckmondwike, Holme Valley North, and Lindley wards were "battlegrounds", and that the Liberal Democrats and Green Party were unlikely to support Labour if they needed to work with other parties having lost seats.

Electoral process 
The council elects its councillors in thirds, with a third being up for election every year for three years, with no election in the fourth year. The election will take place by first-past-the-post voting, with wards generally being represented by three councillors, with one elected in each election year to serve a four-year term.

All registered electors (British, Irish, Commonwealth and European Union citizens) living in Kirklees aged 18 or over will be entitled to vote in the election. People who live at two addresses in different councils, such as university students with different term-time and holiday addresses, are entitled to be registered for and vote in elections in both local authorities. Voting in-person at polling stations will take place from 07:00 to 22:00 on election day, and voters will be able to apply for postal votes or proxy votes in advance of the election.

Previous council composition

Results summary

Ward results

Almondbury

Ashbrow

Batley East

Batley West

Birstall & Birkenshaw

Cleckheaton

Colne Valley

Crosland Moor & Netherton

Dalton

Denby Dale

Dewsbury East

Dewsbury South

Dewsbury West

Golcar

Greenhead

Heckmondwike

Holme Valley North

Holme Valley South

Kirkburton

Lindley

Liversedge & Gomersal

Mirfield

Newsome

References

Kirklees Council elections
Kirklees